Bernard Bresslaw (25 February 193411 June 1993) was a British actor and comedian. He was best known as a member of the Carry On film franchise. Bresslaw also worked on television and stage, did recordings and wrote a series of poetry.

Biography
Bernard Bresslaw was born the youngest of three boys into a Jewish family in Stepney, London, on 25 February 1934. He attended the Coopers' Company's School in Tredegar Square, Bow, London E3. His father was a tailor's cutter and he became interested in acting after visits to the Hackney Empire. London County Council awarded him a scholarship to train at the Royal Academy of Dramatic Art where he won the Emile Littler Award as the most promising actor. After Educating Archie on radio and The Army Game on television, more television, film and Shakespearean theatre roles followed, until he was cast in Carry On Cowboy in 1965. Although officially starring in 14 Carry On films, Bresslaw did appear in one other: Carry On Nurse. The legs of Terence Longdon were deemed to be too thin and scrawny looking, so Bresslaw's were used as 'stand'-ins for the scene where Joan Sims gives him a bath.

Bresslaw's catchphrase, in his strong Cockney accent, was "I only arsked" (sic), first used in The Army Game, and later revived in Carry On Camping (1969). In his fleeting appearance as an angry lorry driver in the 1970 film Spring and Port Wine, his character was dubbed. 

Because of his height, he was briefly considered for the part of the Creature in Hammer's Curse of Frankenstein (1957), which ultimately went instead to  Christopher Lee. Bresslaw later made a comedy version of Dr. Jekyll and Mr. Hyde for Hammer titled The Ugly Duckling (1959). He made great efforts to prepare for roles, for example learning Fanagalo phrases for Carry On Up the Jungle (1970).

He featured as Varga, the lead villain in the 1967 Doctor Who story The Ice Warriors. Even though all the actors playing the aliens were over six feet tall, Bresslaw towered over them. Sonny Caldinez, who played an Ice Warrior in the story, stated in a 2004 interview that Bresslaw "was the only man that could make me feel small."

Between 1985 and 1987, Bresslaw played the role of 'Gorilla' in Yorkshire TV's 'The Giddy Game Show'.

Bresslaw was a member of the Grand Order of Water Rats, a British entertainment fraternity and in 1988 he was elected "King Rat" of the order.

Bresslaw was a Freemason and member of Chelsea Lodge 3098.

Filmography

Films

 The Men of Sherwood Forest (1954) as Garth (uncredited)
 The Glass Cage (1955) as Ivan the Terrible, Cossack Dancer (uncredited)
 Satellite in the Sky (1956) as Technician (uncredited)
 Up in the World (1956) as Williams (uncredited)
 High Tide at Noon (1957) as Tom Robey (uncredited)
 Blood of the Vampire (1958) as Tall Sneak Thief
 I Only Arsked! (1958) as Popeye Popplewell
 Too Many Crooks (1959) as Snowdrop
 The Ugly Duckling (1959) as Henry Jekyll
 It's All Happening (1962) as Parsons
 Carry On Cowboy (1965) as Little Heap
 Morgan: A Suitable Case for Treatment (1966) as Policeman
 Carry On Screaming! (1966) as Sockett
 Follow That Camel (1967) as Sheikh Abdul Abulbul
 Carry On Doctor (1967) as Ken Biddle
 Carry On Up the Khyber (1968) as Bungdit Din
 Carry On Camping (1969) as Bernie Lugg
 Moon Zero Two (1969) as Harry
 Spring and Port Wine (1970) as Lorry Driver
 Carry On Up the Jungle (1970) as Upsidasi
 Carry On Loving (1970) as Gripper Burke
 Up Pompeii (1971) as Gorgo 
 The Magnificent Seven Deadly Sins (1971) as Mr Violet (segment "Avarice")
 Carry On at Your Convenience (1971) as Bernie Hulke
 Blinker's Spy-Spotter (1972) as South
 Carry On Matron (1972) as Ernie Bragg
 Carry On Abroad (1972) as Brother Bernard
 Carry On Girls (1973) as Peter Potter
 Carry On Dick (1974) as Sir Roger Daley
 Vampira (1974) as Pottinger
 One of Our Dinosaurs Is Missing (1975) as Fan Choy 
 Carry On Behind (1975) as Arthur Upmore
 In the Movies it Doesn't Hurt (1975) as several
 Joseph Andrews (1977) as Parson Trulliber (uncredited)
 Jabberwocky (1977) as The Landlord 
 The Fifth Musketeer (1979) as Bernard
 Hawk the Slayer (1980) as Gort 
 Krull (1983) as Rell the Cyclops
 Asterix and the Big Fight (1989) as Obelix (English version, voice)
 Leon the Pig Farmer (1992) as Rabbi Hartmann
 Bernard Bresslaw: A Story About Bernard Bresslaw (2009)

Television series
 The Adventures of Robin Hood The Black Patch as Sir Dunstan's Captain
 The Army Game
 Our House (1961–1962) 22 episodes William Singer
 Carry On Christmas Specials and Carry On Laughing
 Danger Man: The Outcast, as Leo (1964)
 Doctor Who serial The Ice Warriors (1967) as Varga, an Ice Warrior
 The Goodies Series 2 (1 October 1971) episode Scotland as the zookeeper.
 The Book Tower (1987)
 T-Bag (1987) Series 3 (in one episode) as Omar
 Terry and June (16 November 1982) Series 5 Episode 5 (Playing pool) Morris
 Sykes  (7 November 1974) Series 3 Episode 4 (The Band) Johnny Brunswick 
 Doctor in the House (13 September 1969) Series 1, Episode 10 (The Rocky Mountain Spotted Fever Casino) Malcolm
 Mann's Best Friends (1984) 6 episodes

Other works

UK chart singles
 "Mad Passionate Love/You Need Feet" (1958) (UK No. 6)
 "The Army Game/What Do We Do in the Army?" (1958) Michael Medwin, Bernard Bresslaw, Alfie Bass & Leslie Fyson (UK No. 5)
 "Charlie Brown/The Teenager's Lament" (1959)
 "Ivy Will Cling/I Found a Hole" (1959)

Stage actor
Bresslaw performed with the Young Vic Theatre Company, the Royal Shakespeare Company and the National Theatre.
One of his last stage performances was as Malvolio in Twelfth Night at the Open Air Theatre, Regent's Park (1990).

He played the genie in the lamp in Aladdin at the Theatre Royal, Newcastle, in the 1990s.

He played the genie on the Sooty Show and also voiced Gorilla on The Giddy Game Show.

He played Mephistopheles, alongside James Warwick in the title role of an Oxford Stage Company regional touring production of Doctor Faustus in 1987.

He was a member of the oldest theatrical fraternity in the world, the elite Grand Order of Water Rats.

Song
His song "You Need Feet" (a parody of "You Need Hands" by Max Bygraves) was used in the Rutles' TV special, accompanying the Yoko Ono film parody "A Thousand Feet of Film". This was cut from the syndicated version and the original DVD release, but was restored (along with other cut footage) in later DVD releases.

BT adverts
Bresslaw, together with Miriam Margolyes, appeared with English comedienne Maureen Lipman in a series of British Telecom advertisements in the late 1980s. Bresslaw and Margolyes played Gerald and Dolly, a nervous couple who drop in unannounced on Lipman's character Beatrice "Beattie" Bellman and her husband Harry.

Poetry
Bresslaw was the author of a privately published volume of poetry, Ode to the Dead Sea Scrolls.

Personal life
Bresslaw was married to the dancer Betty Wright from 1959 until his death in 1993. They had three sons: James, Mark and Jonathan.

Death
Bresslaw died of a sudden heart attack on 11 June 1993. He had collapsed in his dressing room at the Open Air Theatre in Regent's Park, London, where he was to play Grumio in the New Shakespeare Company's production of Taming of the Shrew. His body was cremated at Golders Green Crematorium, north London, where his ashes were buried on 17 June 1993.

References

External links

 
 
 

1934 births
1993 deaths
20th-century English male actors
Alumni of RADA
British male comedy actors
English male comedians
English male film actors
English Jews
English male television actors
English male stage actors
People from Stepney
Male actors from London
Comedians from London
Musicians from London
Singers from London
English comedy musicians
English male singers
English male musicians
Golders Green Crematorium
British novelty song performers
Jewish male actors
Jewish English comedians
20th-century English singers
20th-century English comedians
20th-century British male singers